Dr. Ritu Karidhal Srivastava  is an Indian scientist working with the Indian Space Research Organisation (ISRO). She was a Deputy Operations Director to India's Mars orbital mission, Mangalyaan. She has been referred to as one of the many "Rocket Women" of India. She was born and brought up in Lucknow and is an aerospace engineer.

Early life and family 
Karidhal was born in Lucknow, Uttar Pradesh. She grew up in a middle-class family which placed great emphasis on education. She has two brothers and two sisters. Lack of resources and unavailability of coaching institutions and tuitions left her to rely only on her self motivation to succeed.  As a child, she knew that her interest was in the space sciences. Gazing at the night sky for hours and thinking about outer space, she wondered about the moon, as to how it changes its shape and size; studied the stars and wanted to know what lay behind the dark space. In her teens, she started collecting newspaper cuttings about any space-related activity and kept track of the activities of ISRO and NASA.

Karidhal completed her B. Sc. in Physics from University of Lucknow. She Completed her M. Sc. in Physics from University of Lucknow and got enrolled in a doctorate course in the Physics Department. She later taught in the same department. She was a research scholar at Lucknow University for six months. She joined IISc, Bangalore, to pursue masters in aerospace engineering.

She has been conferred honoris causa (an honorary doctorate) D.Sc by Lucknow University during annual convocation 2019.

Career 
Ritu Karidhal has worked for ISRO since 1997. She played a key role in the development of India's Mars Orbiter Mission, Mangalyaan, dealing with the detailing and the execution of the craft's onward autonomy system. She was also the Deputy Operations Director of this mission.

Mangalyan was one of the greatest achievements of ISRO. It made India the fourth country in the world to reach Mars. It was done in 18 months time and at a far lesser cost to the taxpayers - ₹450 crores only. Her job was to conceptualize and execute the craft's onward autonomy system, which operated the satellite's functions independently in space and responded appropriately to malfunctions.

She supervised the Chandrayaan 2 mission as the mission director.

When the United Kingdom assumed presidency of the G7 in 2021, Karidhal was appointed by the country's Minister for Women and Equalities Liz Truss to a newly formed Gender Equality Advisory Council (GEAC) chaired by Sarah Sands.

Recognition 
Karidhal received the ISRO Young Scientist Award in 2007 from A. P. J. Abdul Kalam, the president of India.

Karidhal has also presented at TED and TEDx events describing the success of the Mars Orbiter Mission.

Karidhal was awarded an honorary doctorate by the Lucknow University, her alma mater. It was conferred by Governor Anandiben Patel.

References  

Living people
Indian women engineers
Indian Space Research Organisation people
Scientists from Lucknow
Women scientists from Uttar Pradesh
Engineers from Uttar Pradesh
20th-century Indian engineers
21st-century Indian engineers
21st-century Indian women scientists
20th-century Indian women scientists
Indian women physicists
Indian space scientists
University of Lucknow alumni
Indian Institute of Science alumni
20th-century women engineers
21st-century women engineers
Women planetary scientists
Planetary scientists
1975 births